Elaine Winter may refer to:

 Elaine Winter (athlete) (born 1932), South African sprinter
 Elaine Winter (figure skater) (1895–?), German figure skater